The third and final season of the American music competition television show The X Factor premiered on Fox on September 11, 2013 and ended on December 19, 2013. This season was hosted by Mario Lopez. Simon Cowell and Demi Lovato returned to the judging panel, while Kelly Rowland and Paulina Rubio joined the panel as replacements for the departing judges.

Producer auditions began on March 6, 2013, in Los Angeles, and ended on May 4, 2013, in Denver. The judges auditions, which are televised, began on May 21, 2013, in Charleston, and ended on July 12, 2013, in Los Angeles. New for this season is the removal of the boot camp and judges' houses rounds of the competition which have been replaced with a new middle section, more reminiscent of the live shows.

On December 19, 2013, Alex & Sierra won the show, as mentored by Cowell. On February 7, 2014, Cowell announced he was returning to the UK show to judge the 2014 UK series, which was followed by Fox announcing that they would not be renewing the show for a fourth season.

Judges and hosts

On October 22, 2012, it was announced that The X Factor would be returning for a third season, with Simon Cowell confirmed to be returning. On December 14, 2012, L.A. Reid announced he would not return to the show for its third season, as he wished to refocus his work on his record company, Epic Records. Britney Spears stated her intentions on returning to the show for its third season, but she eventually did not return, in order to focus on her music career.

Following the conclusion of season two, Demi Lovato questioned whether she would return for another season, or instead focus on her own career as a performer, stating, "I have no idea what's gonna happen next season, and I don't think anybody does." On March 28, 2013, it was confirmed that Lovato would return. On April 22, it was confirmed by Fox that Mario Lopez would be returning to host season three, along with the news of Khloé Kardashian not returning as co-host. 

Rumors passed that Reba McEntire and Jennifer Love Hewitt would be judges. 

Eventually, Cowell confirmed via his Twitter account that the full judging panel would be announced on May 20, 2013, with auditions beginning the next day. On that same day, Fox confirmed that Destiny's Child member and judge on the 2011 series of the UK show (who previously replaced Dannii Minogue), Kelly Rowland, and Mexican singer and former La Voz... México judge Paulina Rubio had been hired to replace Reid and Spears.

Selection process

Auditions

In addition to having online auditions, it was announced at the conclusion of season 2 that auditions for season 3 would be held throughout the country in Charleston, South Carolina; Denver, Colorado; Long Island, New York; Los Angeles, California and New Orleans, Louisiana. On the "Registration and Audition Rules" document on The X Factors website about the auditions, it was announced where the auditions were going to be taking place.

Deliberations
Instead of the traditional bootcamp stages, a deliberation stage (very similar to Britain's Got Talent) was introduced to cut down the "yes" from the auditions to perform at Four-chair challenge. The judges cut the acts from 218 to 40. This took place on July 31, 2013.

After the Deliberation and Reveal Stages, but before the start of the four-chair challenge, the judges found out their categories and they are as follows: Rowland has the Overs, Rubio has the Boys, Lovato has the Girls and Cowell has the groups. They were revealed at Shrine Auditorium.

Four-chair challenge
For this season of The X Factor, Cowell confirmed that the boot camp and judges' houses sections of the competition, which traditionally followed the audition rounds, had been dropped and replaced with a brand new stage called "The Four-Chair challenge", which took place at the Shrine Auditorium and was filmed over 2 days in September 2013. Speaking on the change, he said "It [boot camp and Judges' houses] was the one element of the show I wasn't happy with, and it looked too similar to what everybody else is doing." He went on to describe the new "middle section" as "really dramatic, very tough on us and the contestants, and very high pressure", and compared the new round as similar to the live shows.

This season, the categories did not follow the age-based format from season two but rather the format from season one: Boys, Girls, Over 25s and Groups. Rowland mentored Over 25s, Lovato the Girls, Rubio the Boys, and for the second season in a row, Cowell mentored the Groups.  Groups Restless Road, Sweet Suspense, and Forever in Your Mind all consist of contestants who originally auditioned as soloists.

The four-chair challenge episodes were broadcast on two 2-hour Wednesdays and two 1-hour Thursdays shows on October 2, 3, 9 and 10.

Key:
 – Act was immediately eliminated after performance without switch
 – Act was switched out later in the competition and eventually eliminated
 – Act was not switched out and made the final four of their own category

 Rubio initially switched out Tim Olstad for Timmy Thames, but after some consideration brought him back and instead switched out Al Calderon.

Contestants
The top 16 contestants were confirmed as follows;

Key:
 – Winner
 – Runner-Up
 - 3rd place

Live shows
The first two-hour live show aired on a special Tuesday time slot on October 29; which followed the same format as the first season with each of the judges narrowing their number of acts down to three, without a public vote. The public vote then started with the following performance and results shows starting November 6, which aired on Wednesdays and Thursdays respectively. As with previous seasons, each live show had a different theme. The live final took place in on December 18 and 19. Cowell had also said on Twitter that there may be a wildcard this season. The leaderboard that showed which act had received the most public votes did not return.

Musical guests
Each results show featured musical performances from at least two artists. There was no guest performer on the first result show. Selena Gomez was supposed to perform on the second result show, but was postponed to third result show night which featured a performance from season 2 finalist Fifth Harmony. One Direction performed on the third results show. Michael Bublé performed on the fifth performance show, then again on the fifth results show alongside judge Demi Lovato. Emblem3 and Little Mix performed on the sixth results show, while Enrique Iglesias performed during the seventh results show. Paulina Rubio, Mary J. Blige, Lea Michele, Leona Lewis, Pitbull and One Direction performed on the finale.

Results summary

Color key
 Act in team Demi Lovato

 Act in team Simon Cowell

 Act in team Paulina Rubio

 Act in team Kelly Rowland

  There was no public vote in the first week and therefore no final showdown. Each judge was required to save three of their own acts.
  Levi returned to the competition in week two because the judges felt that he should not have been eliminated in week one.
  Owing to graphic errors in which incorrect voting numbers were displayed on screen during the performance recap, there was no elimination in week two. All acts performed again on Thursday night in week two and a public re-vote was conducted. Carlos Guevara was eliminated on Wednesday night in week three after receiving the fewest votes in week two.
  Cowell was not required to vote as there was already a majority, but said after the show that he would have voted to eliminate Olstad.
  Cowell revealed in an interview that Alex & Sierra "won every single week" in the public vote except the fourth.

Live show details

Week 1 (October 29)

There was no public vote in the first week. Instead, each of the judges selected one of their own acts to eliminate.

Judges' votes to eliminate
Lovato: Danie Geimer – gave no reason.
Rubio: Josh Levi – gave no reason.
Rowland: James Kenney – based on the performances.
Cowell: RoXxy Montana – gave no reason.

Week 2 (November 6/7)
November 6
Theme: Motown songs (billed as "Motown Night")
Group performance: "ABC" / "Signed, Sealed, Delivered I'm Yours" / "Reach Out I'll Be There" / "Dancing in the Street" (all top 13 finalists except Josh Levi)

One of the four acts that did not face the public vote in week 1, and was eliminated by their mentor, was reinstated to the show as the judges felt that the act "deserves a second shot". The reinstated act was announced as Josh Levi.

November 7
Theme: "Save Me" songs

Owing to graphics error in which incorrect voting numbers were displayed on screen during the performance recap, there was no elimination this week, instead all the acts performed their "Save Me" songs on Thursday night and a public re-vote was conducted after the show. The results were announced the following week, at the start of the live show on Wednesday night.

Selena Gomez was going to perform her single "Slow Down" but due to graphics issues, she performed on the second night in week 3.

Week 3 (November 13/14)
Theme: Songs from the 1980s (billed as "80s Night")
Group performance: "Perfect Day"
Musical guests: Selena Gomez ("Slow Down") and Fifth Harmony ("Me & My Girls")

Carlos Guevara, the act that received the fewest votes from the public re-vote in week 2, was eliminated at the start of the November 13 episode. He would have performed "Mad World". Starting from week three, two acts were eliminated from each results show until week six. The three acts with the fewest public votes were announced and then the act with the fewest votes was automatically eliminated. The remaining two acts then performed in the final showdown and face the judges' votes.

Judges' votes to eliminate
 Rowland: Khaya Cohen – based on the final showdown performances, effectively backing her act, Rachel Potter.
 Rubio: Rachel Potter – gave no reason.
 Lovato: Rachel Potter – gave no reason, though effectively backed their own act, Khaya Cohen.
 Cowell: Rachel Potter – felt that Cohen had more potential.

However, voting statistics revealed that Potter received more votes than Cohen which meant that if Cowell sent the result to deadlock, Potter would have been saved.

Week 4 (November 20/21)
Theme: Songs by British artists (billed as "British Invasion")
Musical guest: One Direction ("Story of My Life")

Judges' votes to eliminate
Rowland: Tim Olstad – based on the final showdown performances.
Lovato: Tim Olstad – gave no reason.
Rubio: Tim Olstad – gave no reason.
Cowell was not required to vote since there was already a majority, but said after the show that his "heart went out to" Olivero, so he would have voted to eliminate Olstad.

Week 5 (November 27/28)
Theme: Big band (billed as "Big Band Night")
Guest mentor: Michael Bublé
Group performances:
Wednesday: "Cry Me a River"
Thursday: "Somewhere Only We Know"
Musical guests: 
Wednesday:  Michael Bublé ("You Make Me Feel So Young")
Thursday: Demi Lovato ("Neon Lights") and Michael Bublé ("It's a Beautiful Day")

Judges' votes to eliminate
Lovato: Josh Levi – gave no reason, though effectively backed their own act, Rion Paige.
Rubio: Rion Paige – backed her own act, Josh Levi.
Rowland: Rion Paige – gave no reason.
Cowell: Josh Levi – could not decide and sent the result to deadlock.

With the acts in the bottom two receiving two votes each, the result went to deadlock and reverted to the earlier public vote. Levi was eliminated as the act with the fewest public votes.

Week 6: Quarter-Final (December 4/5)
Themes: Divas; unplugged songs (billed as "stripped down songs")
Musical guests: Emblem3 ("Just for One Day") and Little Mix ("Move")

For the first time this season, each act performed two songs.

Judges' votes to eliminate
Lovato: Carlito Olivero – backed her own act, Rion Paige.
Rubio: Rion Paige – backed her own act, Carlito Olivero.
Rowland: Rion Paige – based on the final showdown performances though stated both acts did not give their best.
Cowell: Rion Paige – wanted to give Olivero the opportunity to stay in the competition as he felt the competition was "probably his last chance".

Week 7: Semi-Final (December 11/12)
Themes: Viewers' choice; "songs to get you to the final" (no theme)
Group performances:
Wednesday: "Falling Slowly" (performed by Alex & Sierra and Carlito Olivero) and "Every Breath You Take" (performed by Jeff Gutt and Restless Road)
Thursday: "Stronger (What Doesn't Kill You)"
Musical guest: Enrique Iglesias ("Heart Attack")

On December 4, the song choices for the public were revealed.

The semi-final did not feature a final showdown and instead the act with the fewest public votes, Restless Road, was automatically eliminated. The top three acts each then performed a victory song of their choice after they were announced safe, with Olivero performing "Suavemente", Alex & Sierra performing "Let Her Go", and Gutt performing "Open Arms".

Week 8: Final (December 18/19)
The final consisted of two two-hour episodes on December 18 and 19.
December 18
Themes: Winner's song (billed as "song to win"); celebrity duets (billed as "musical hero duets"); favorite performance (billed as "song of the season")
Group performance: "We Will Rock You"
Musical guest: Paulina Rubio ("Boys Will Be Boys")

December 19
Theme: Christmas songs
Group performances: "One" (all top 13 finalists) and "Love Me Again" (performed by Alex & Sierra and Jeff Gutt)
Musical guests: Mary J. Blige ("Rudolph the Red-Nosed Reindeer"), Lea Michele ("Cannonball"), Leona Lewis ("One More Sleep"), Pitbull ("Timber") and One Direction ("Midnight Memories")

Notes

 There was no public vote in the first week and therefore no final showdown. Each judge was required to save three of their own acts.
 Levi returned to the competition in week two because the judges felt that he should not have been eliminated in week one.
 Owing to graphic errors in which incorrect voting numbers were displayed on screen during the performance recap, there was no elimination in week two. All acts performed again on Thursday night in week two and a public re-vote was conducted. Carlos Guevara was eliminated on Wednesday night in week three after receiving the fewest votes in week two.
 Cowell was not required to vote as there was already a majority, but said after the show that he would have voted to eliminate Olstad.
 Cowell revealed in an interview that Alex & Sierra "won every single week" in the public vote except the fourth.

Contestants who Appeared on Other Seasons or Shows

 James Kenney auditioned for Season 1, but was eliminated during the Judges' Home round.
 Jeff Gutt auditioned for Season 2, but was eliminated on the last day of the Bootcamp round.
 Ellona Santiago competed in Season 1 as a member of InTENsity, who were eliminated in 12th place.
 Carlito Olivero competed on Making Menudo on MTV under his real name "Carlos Olivero".  He was one of the five contestants selected to become a member of Menudo
 Chase Goehring competed on the twelfth season of America's Got Talent.  He received a golden buzzer from guest judge DJ Khaled during Judges' Cuts.  He finished in the Top Ten.
 Stone Martin and Timmy Thames appeared on Boy Band.  Both were eliminated on episode 1.

Famous Relations
 Primrose Martin, who was eliminated during the Four Chair Challenge, is the daughter of Skip Martin

Reception

U.S. Nielsen ratings 

Notes
 Due to the 2013 MLB World Series running past October 28, the first live show of the season aired on October 29 to make room for Wednesday's potential deciding game.

Controversy

Voting numbers graphic error
Due to graphic errors made in the top 13 round of the live shows regarding voting, all voting results posted in that episode were invalidated, and the contestants sang once more in the show of November 7, with the results revealed on November 13.

References

External links

Season 3
2013 American television seasons
United States 03